The Midwest Intercollegiate Volleyball Association (MIVA) is a collegiate club men's volleyball sports league in the Midwest United States. It is differentiated from the varsity Midwestern Intercollegiate Volleyball Association (also called "MIVA").

Conference schools 
The conference schools are divided into NCAA Division 1 and Division 2 schools.

Division 1
These teams are divided into the following three divisions:

Big Ten Men's Volleyball Association (BTMVA)
 University of Illinois
 Indiana University
 University of Iowa
 University of Michigan
 Michigan State University
 University of Minnesota
 Northwestern University
 Ohio State University
 Purdue University
 University of Wisconsin

Midwest 10 Volleyball Conference
 Ball State University
 Illinois State University
 Iowa State University
 Lakeland College
 Marquette University
 Northern Illinois University
 UIC
 University of Notre Dame
 UWM (Milwaukee)
 University of Wisconsin–Oshkosh

Great Midwest Men's Volleyball Conference (GMMVC)

 Bowling Green State University
 Central Michigan University
 University of Cincinnati
 University of Dayton
 Kent State University
 University of Kentucky
 Miami University
 Ohio University
 Ohio Northern University
 University of Toledo

Division 2
 Earlham College
 Eastern Illinois University
 Grand Valley State University
 Illinois-B
 Indiana-B
 Miami U-B
 Michigan-B
 Michigan State-White
 Ohio State-2
 Rose-Hulman Institute of Technology
 University of Wisconsin–Oshkosh-2
 Wabash College
 Wittenberg University
 Wright State University
 Xavier University

External links
Official website

 
Volleyball competitions in the United States